Lee Van Dowski is a pseudonym for Renaud Lewandowski, a French electronic music artist who moved to Geneva in 2000.

Discography
Albums
 A Lego Element (2003)
 Highway to Xenia (2005)

Remixes
 Miss Kittin - ("All You Need") (2011)

External links 
 Transitions Show
 Discogs Page
 MySpace Page
 Mental Groove Record Label
 Cadenza Records Label

Year of birth missing (living people)
Living people
French musicians